Leivonmäki National Park is a national park in Central Finland.

Typical scenery consists of swamps, shores of a medium-sized lake Rutajärvi and esker forests.

Gallery

See also 
 List of national parks of Finland
 Protected areas of Finland

References

External links
 
 Outdoors.fi – Leivonmäki National Park

Joutsa
Protected areas established in 2003
Tourist attractions in Central Finland Region
Geography of Central Finland
National parks of Finland